The , officially the 2016 All Japan Adults Football Tournament, and most known as the 2016 Shakaijin Cup,  was the 52nd edition of the annually contested single-elimination tournament (or cup) for non-league clubs.

Calendar

Source:

Schedule

Round of 32

Round of 16

Quarter-finals

Semi-finals

Third place match

Final

References

External links
About the tournament

See also
2016 J1 League
2016 J2 League
2016 J3 League
2016 Japanese Regional Leagues
2016 Emperor's Cup
2016 J.League Cup

2016 in Japanese football